Makari Leteteli Giorgi Grdzelis Dze was a Georgian calligrapher and scholar of the 9th century.

Makari was from Georgian kingdom of Kartli (Iberia), from village of Leteti. He was relative of Patriarch Ephraim and the student of Gregory of Khandzta.

Makari worked in Jerusalem in Mar Saba. Makari in 864 AD created and wrote famous  "Sinai Polykephalon".

References

Calligraphers from Georgia (country)
9th-century scholars
9th-century people from Georgia (country)